Senate Staff Health and Fitness Facility is the gym of the United States Senate located in Washington, D.C. Prior to 2001, it was referred to as the Senate Health and Fitness Facility (without mentioning the "staff").

A revolving fund administered by the Department of the Treasury for the Architect of the Capitol to run the facility was established in Chapter 4, Section 121f of the Title 2 of the United States Code. The revolving fund receives funds from membership dues and monies obtained through the operation of the Senate waste recycling program.

The Committee on Rules and Administration of the Senate maintains regulations pertaining to the operation and use of the Senate Staff Health and Fitness Facility.

Buildings of the United States government in Washington, D.C.
Health and Fitness Facility